Aliquat 336 (Starks' catalyst) is a quaternary ammonium salt used as a phase transfer catalyst and metal extraction reagent. It contains a mixture of C8 (octyl) and C10 (decyl) chains with C8 predominating.  It is an ionic liquid.

Applications

Organic Chemistry
Aliquat 336 is used as a phase transfer catalyst, including in the catalytic oxidation of cyclohexene to 1,6-hexanedioic acid. This reaction is more environmentally friendly. It is an example of green chemistry, compared with the traditional method of oxidizing cyclohexanol or cyclohexanone with nitric acid or potassium permanganate, which produce hazardous wastes.

Aliquat 336 was used in the total synthesis of manzamine A by Darren Dixon in an early step to the electrophile.

Solvent extraction of metals

Aliquat 336 has been used for the extraction of metals, it does so by acting as a liquid anion exchanger. It is often used while diluted in hydrocarbon solvents such as aromatic kerosene. It is possible to use it in aliphatic kerosene but in such solvents often a phase modifier (typically a long chain alcohol) must be added to prevent the formation of third phase.

Waste treatment 
Several applications have been successfully carried out with Aliquat 336, such as the recovery of acids or acid salts, or the removal of certain metals from waste water. In addition, foaming has also been controlled by using this agent during the treatment of wastewater containing anionic surfactants

References

Quaternary ammonium compounds
Chlorides
Catalysts
Ionic liquids